A state highway, state road, or state route (and the equivalent provincial highway, provincial road, or provincial route) is usually a road that is either numbered or maintained by a sub-national state or province. A road numbered by a state or province falls below numbered national highways (Canada being a notable exception to this rule) in the hierarchy (route numbers are used to aid navigation, and may or may not indicate ownership or maintenance). Roads maintained by a state or province include both nationally numbered highways and un-numbered state highways. Depending on the state, "state highway" may be used for one meaning and "state road" or "state route" for the other.

In some countries such as New Zealand, the word "state" is used in its sense of a sovereign state or country. By this meaning a state highway is a road maintained and numbered by the national government rather than local authorities.

Countries

Australia

Australia's State Route system covers urban and inter-regional routes that are not included in the National Route or the National Highway systems. These routes are marked with a blue shield. Sometimes a state route may be formed when a former national route is decommissioned.

Most states and territories have introduced an alphanumeric route numbering system, either completely or partially replacing the previous systems.

Brazil

Brazil is another country that is divided into states and has state highways.

Canada
 

 

Canada is divided into provinces and territories, each of which maintains its own system of provincial or territorial highways, which form the majority of the country's highway network. There is also the national transcontinental Trans-Canada Highway system, which is marked by distinct signs, but has no uniform numeric designation across the country. In the eastern provinces, for instance, an unnumbered (though sometimes with a named route branch) Trans-Canada route marker is co-signed with a numbered provincial sign, with the provincial route often continuing alone outside the Trans-Canada Highway section. However, in the western provinces, the two parallel Trans-Canada routes are consistently numbered with Trans-Canada route markers; as Highways 1 and 16 respectively.

Canada also has a designated National Highway System, but the system is completely unsigned, aside from the Trans-Canada routes. This makes Canada unique in that national highway designations are generally secondary to subnational routes.

Germany

In Germany, state roads are a road class which is ranking below the federal road network. The responsibility for road planning, construction and maintenance is vested in the federal states of Germany.

Most federal states use the term  (marked with 'L'), while for historical reasons Saxony and Bavaria use the term  (marked with 'S'). The appearance of the shields differs from state to state.

Italy

In Italy, "state" refers to the Italian State, (ie, the national government) similar to New Zealand below. Italy's Strade Statali extend for some 18,000 km, overseen by the Azienda Nazionale Autonoma delle Strade (ANAS) founded in 1946, replacing the  A.A.S.S. (Azienda Autonoma delle Strade Statali) of 1928. The next level of roads below Strada Statali is Strada Regionale ("regional roads").

India

State highways in India are numbered highways that are laid and maintained by state governments.

Mexico

Mexico's State Highway System is a system of urban and state routes constructed and maintained by each Mexican state. The main purpose of the state networks is to serve as a feeder system to the federal highway system. All states except the Federal District operate a road network. Each state marks these routes with a white shield containing the abbreviated name of the state plus the route number.

New Zealand

New Zealand state highways are national highways – the word "state" in this sense means "government" or "public" (as in state housing and state schools), not a division of a country.

New Zealand's state highway system is a nationwide network of roads covering the North Island and the South Island. As of 2006, just under 100 roads have a "State Highway" designation. The NZ Transport Agency administers them. The speed limit for most state highways is 100 km/h, with reductions when one passes through a densely populated area.

The highways in New Zealand are all state highways, and the network consists of SH 1 running the length of both main islands, SH 2–5 and 10–58 in the North Island, and SH 6–8 and 60–99 in the South Island. National and provincial highways are numbered approximately north to south. State Highway 1 runs the length of both islands.

South Korea

Local highways are the next important roads under the National highways. The number has two, three, or four digits. Highways with two-digit numbers routes are called State-funded local highways.

United States

State highways are generally a mixture of primary and secondary roads, although some are freeways (for example, State Route 99 in California, which links many of the cities of the Central Valley, Route 128 in Massachusetts, or parts of Route 101 in New Hampshire).  Each state has its own system for numbering and its own marker. The default marker is a white circle containing a black sans serif number (often inscribed in a black square or slightly rounded square), according to the Manual on Uniform Traffic Control Devices (MUTCD). However each state is free to choose a different marker, and most states have. States may choose a design theme relevant to its state (such as an outline of the state itself) to distinguish state route markers from interstate, county, or municipal route markers.

See also

 List of longest state highways in the United States
 List of numbered highways in the United States
 Interstate Highway System, U.S. Highway System
 Missouri supplemental route
 County highway
 Highways in Australia
 Numbered street

References

 
Types of roads